Allenspark is an unincorporated town, a post office, and a census-designated place (CDP) located in and governed by Boulder County, Colorado, United States. The CDP is a part of the Boulder, CO Metropolitan Statistical Area. The Allenspark post office has the ZIP code 80510. At the United States Census 2010, the population of the Allenspark CDP was 528, while the population of the 80510 ZIP Code Tabulation Area was 420.

History 
Allenspark is a park in the geographical sense—it is a high meadow surrounded by mountains. While it was first visited by Native Americans and later by trappers, Allen's Park—now spelled Allenspark—got its name from a miner who built the first cabin in the area.

During the Colorado Gold Rush of 1859, Allenspark's namesake, Alonzo Nelson Allen, left his family in Columbus, Wisconsin, to seek his fortune in the Kansas/Nebraska Territories that became Colorado. He settled on the St. Vrain River, south of the current city of Longmont, Colorado.

Allen prospected and ran cattle in Allenspark and built a cabin there in 1864. The cabin burned down in 1894, the year Allen died.

The village of Allenspark is situated on part of the original George Mack homestead, site of Crystal Springs, an excellent water source. After Mack's homestead patent was granted on January 7, 1895, Mack sold some of the land to the Allens Park Land and Townsite Co. on May 9, 1896. The land company filed a plat for the village on May 23, 1896, and began selling small building lots.

In Weaving Mountain Memories, Lorna Knowlton writes, "George Pheifer, a prominent early settler who came into Allenspark over the Stone Mountain Road from Lyons in 1896, said Allen never homesteaded his land but merely squatted on it in 1864. Pheifer said, 'All Alonzo Allen ever did for Allenspark was to give it a name.'"

In the late 1890s, most residents of the Allenspark area were farmers or ranchers, but by the early 1900s there was a resurgence in gold fever. The Clara Belle Mining and Reduction Co. attracted investors from as far away as Omaha, Nebraska, for what turned out to be a folly. Meanwhile, tourism was booming, and farmers and miners alike found a better income catering to tourists during the summer months. The first post office application was filed on May 29, 1896, by C.K. Hirshfeld.

The village of Allenspark began to grow when summer people bought land and built cabins from around 1900 to 1920. Many people came up the South St. Vrain canyon from Longmont, and a number came from as far away as Kansas and Oklahoma in that initial burst. The greater Allenspark area extends beyond the village to include the small communities of Ferncliff, Longs Peak, Meeker Park, Peaceful Valley, Raymond, and Riverside, and is defined by the boundaries of the Allenspark Fire Protection District.

Allenspark remained primarily a summer destination until improved roads and modern technology made mountain living easier than it used to be. Now, many people live year-round in the Allenspark area. In 2000, 500 residences were listed in the phone book. The 2010 census counted a total of 892 housing units, 267 of which were occupied on Census Day (April 1) and 577 of which were seasonally occupied.

Many businesses are still only open during the summer. Businesses include restaurants, lodges, summer camps, coffee shop, and gift shops. There is a filling station and grocery store in Ferncliff, however cell-phone coverage is nearly non-existent.

Skiing was popular in the Allenspark area in the 1920s and 1930s, when international ski jumping competitions were held. Jumps and ski courses included the Willow Creek Slide, Thelma Slide, Butter Bowl, Haugen Slide, and Point-O-Pines. The Rock Creek Ski area was developed after World War II and operated until 1952. Cross-country skiing is still popular, especially on Rock Creek and in Wild Basin.

Geography
Allenspark is located in northwest Boulder County within Roosevelt National Forest in the Front Range of the Colorado Rockies. The western edge of the community is the boundary of Rocky Mountain National Park. State Highway 7 passes through the community, leading north  to Estes Park and east  to Lyons.

The Allenspark CDP has an area of  including  of water.

Demographics

See also

Outline of Colorado
Index of Colorado-related articles
State of Colorado
Colorado cities and towns
Colorado census designated places
Colorado counties
Boulder County, Colorado
List of statistical areas in Colorado
Front Range Urban Corridor
North Central Colorado Urban Area
Denver-Aurora-Boulder, CO Combined Statistical Area
Boulder, CO Metropolitan Statistical Area
Longs Peak
Peak to Peak Highway
Rocky Mountain National Park
Roosevelt National Forest
Wind River Pass

References

External links

Allenspark @ Colorado.com
Allenspark @ UncoverColorado.com
The Allenspark Wind, local newspaper
Allenspark Visitor, online guide
Allenspark Old Gallery, not-for-profit community center, music venue, art center
Boulder County website
Rocky Mountain National Park website
Roosevelt National Forest website

Census-designated places in Boulder County, Colorado
Census-designated places in Colorado
Denver metropolitan area